Max Kaminsky (April 19, 1912 – May 5, 1961) was a Canadian professional ice hockey player and coach. He played four seasons in the National Hockey League, followed by nine seasons in the American Hockey League where he won two Calder Cup championships. He later coached the Pittsburgh Hornets and Philadelphia Rockets, then led the St. Catharines Teepees to the 1960 Memorial Cup championship. The Max Kaminsky Trophy was established by the Ontario Hockey Association in his honour in 1961, and he was posthumously inducted into the Niagara Falls Sports Wall of Fame in 1992.

Early life
Max Kaminsky was born April 19, 1912, in Niagara Falls, Ontario, to parents Harry Kaminsky and Toby Tabacznokov. The family name was spelled Kamensky before his parents immigrated to Canada from Russia. Kaminsky's father worked as a tailor in Canada. Both of his parents had Russian-Jewish heritage.

Kaminsky played minor ice hockey in Niagara Falls. He later played on Niagara Falls Cataracts teams which won an Ontario Hockey Association junior championship in the 1930–31 season, and a senior championship in the 1932–33 season. He also played baseball in Niagara Falls, and was scouted by several Major League Baseball teams.

Playing career
In 1933, he was one of four players from the Cataracts to be signed by the Ottawa Senators in the National Hockey League (NHL). He an assist in his first NHL game. He subsequently played in the NHL for the St. Louis Eagles, Boston Bruins, and Montreal Maroons.

Kaminsky later played in the American Hockey League (AHL). During the 1939–40 AHL season, he scored 11 goals and 29 assists, and was named a second team AHL all-star. He later won two Calder Cup championships in the American Hockey League playing for the Buffalo Bisons. He was later the player-coach of the Pittsburgh Hornets. In Pittsburgh, he received the Dapper Dan Award as the city's outstanding sports person.

Coaching career
Kaminsky coached the Philadelphia Rockets for three seasons, then coached the Niagara Falls Cataracts in the senior ice hockey B-division of the Ontario Hockey Association for the 1955–56 season. After three seasons away from hockey, he coached the St. Catharines Teepees during the 1959–60 season. During the 1960 playoffs for the George Richardson Memorial Trophy versus the Montreal Junior Canadiens, he suffered from pleurisy and was relieved on the bench on two occasions. He returned and led the Teepees to the 1960 Memorial Cup championship versus the Edmonton Oil Kings.

Personal life
Kaminsky played amateur baseball during the summer, and coached youth teams in the Niagara Falls Baseball Association leagues. He played with Niagara Falls Brights seniors from 1938 to 1941, won four Niagara District championships, and Ontario Baseball Association titles in 1940 and 1941. He was also a player coach of the 1942 Niagara Falls senior team, and later played and coached in Welland, Ontario.

Kaminsky was married and had three children. He lived the final 12 years of his life in Niagara Falls, New York, where he operated a restaurant. He resigned from coaching less than one month after winning the Memorial Cup, due to health issues. He died from cancer on May 5, 1961, at Mount Sinai Hospital in New York City.

Honours and legacy
The Max Kaminsky Trophy was established by the Ontario Hockey Association in his honour in 1961, awarded to the most gentlemanly player in the junior-A series. Since 1969, the trophy was awarded to the most outstanding defenceman in the Ontario Hockey League.

Kaminsky was posthumously inducted into the Niagara Falls Sports Wall of Fame in 1992.

Career statistics

Regular season and playoffs

Source:

References

External links

1912 births
1961 deaths
20th-century Canadian Jews
Boston Bruins players
Buffalo Bisons (AHL) players
Canadian baseball players
Canadian expatriate ice hockey players in the United States
Canadian ice hockey centres
Canadian ice hockey coaches
Canadian people of Russian-Jewish descent
Deaths from cancer in New York (state)
Ice hockey people from Ontario
Ice hockey player-coaches
Jewish Canadian sportspeople
Jewish ice hockey players
Montreal Maroons players
New Haven Eagles players
Ontario Hockey League coaches
Ottawa Senators (1917) players
Pittsburgh Hornets players
Providence Reds players
St. Louis Eagles players
Sportspeople from Niagara Falls, Ontario
Springfield Indians players